Barbata is a surname. Notable people with the surname include:

John Barbata (born 1945), American drummer
Laura Anderson Barbata (born 1958), Mexican artist

See also
Barbata, comune in Italy
Venus Barbata